New York's 36th congressional district was a congressional district for the United States House of Representatives in New York. It was created in 1903 as a result of the 1900 Census. It was eliminated as a result of the redistricting cycle after the 1980 Census. It was last represented by John J. LaFalce who was redistricted into the 32nd District.

Past components
1973–1983:
All of Niagara, Orleans
Parts of Erie, Monroe
1963–1973:
All of Wayne
Parts of Monroe
1953–1963:
All of Cayuga, Chenango, Cortland, Ontario, Schuyler, Seneca, Tompkins, Yates
1945–1953:
All of Onondaga
1913–1945:
All of Cayuga, Ontario, Seneca, Wayne, Yates
1903–1913:
All of Erie and Parts of Buffalo

List of members representing the district

Election results

References
 
 
 Congressional Biographical Directory of the United States 1774–present
 Election Statistics 1920–present Clerk of the House of Representatives

36
Former congressional districts of the United States
1903 establishments in New York (state)
1983 disestablishments in New York (state)
Constituencies established in 1903
Constituencies disestablished in 1983